Avadhānaṃ is a literary performance popular from the medieval era in India. Avadhānaṃ was originated and primarily cultivated among Telugu poets. It involves the partial improvisation of poems using specific themes, metres, forms, or words. The true purpose of an Avadhanam event thus is the showcasing, through entertainment, of superior mastery of cognitive capabilities - of observation, memory, multitasking, task switching, retrieval, reasoning and creativity in multiple modes of intelligence - literature, poetry, music, mathematical calculations, puzzle solving etc.

It requires immense memory power and tests a person's capability of performing multiple tasks simultaneously. All the tasks are memory intensive and demand an in-depth knowledge of literature, and prosody. The tasks vary from making up a poem spontaneously to keeping a count of a bell ringing at random. No external memory aids are allowed while performing these tasks except the person's mind.

Avadhānaṃ can be considered as the Divided attention (clinical model of attention) as it is the highest level of attention and it refers to the ability to respond simultaneously to multiple tasks or multiple task demands.

Avadhāni refers to the individual who performs the Avadhānaṃ; one of the many individuals asking questions is a Pṛcchaka (questioner). The first person to ask the question is called "Pradhāna Pṛcchaka" they are the same as any other Pṛcchaka except that they ask the first question. The questions asked are primarily literary in nature. The Pṛcchakas can optionally place additional constraints. Though it is not stated explicitly, conformation to Chandas (poetic metre) is mandatory. Avadhāni should answer them in the form of a poem. The questions generally consist of a description given in prose and the avadhāni has to express it as a poem. The additional restrictions placed by the Pṛcchakas can be anything like asking the avadhāni not to use a given set of the alphabet in the entire poem or to construct only a particular type of poem etc.

Characteristics 

The avadhāni is not allowed to recite the entire poem at once. After listening to the Pṛucchaka's question, the avadhāni constructs the first line of the poem, recites it and moves to the next Pṛcchaka. After listening to all the Pṛucchakas, and reciting one line of poem each, the avadhāni shall return to the Pradhana prucchakas (in a round-robin fashion) and continues with the second line of the poem. The beauty and challenge here is that the avadhāni has to remember the question, the line of poem said before and all the additional constraints placed. They shall not be repeated and any mistake shall disqualify the person from being titled "Avadhani". Every poem has 4 lines, so each Pṛcchaka's turn comes 4 times. Avadhaani has to recite the full poem once he finishes constructing all the lines of the poems. This is called "dharaṇa" and forms the culmination of the Avadhana. Avadhani should use only his memory for all this. An Avadhana can run for multiple days (especially Śatāvadhāna).

It is a general practice for one of the Pṛcchaka to keep ringing a bell randomly and avadhani has to keep track of number of bell rings. The multitude of all these constraints makes Avadhana one of the greatest arts to master.

Of the remaining Pṛcchakas, one person is in charge of "aprastuta-prasangam" (irrelevant incident). His responsibility is to distract the avadhani with questions and topics unrelated to the avadhanam and the avadhani has to reply to his questions and riddles. The Pṛcchaka who manages this should also be equally intelligent and witty to entertain the audience with his questions. An additional challenge for Avadhani here is not to get distracted by these digressions and give witty answers spontaneously even to some of the silly questions.such great memory and retention (dharana) is most important and Shri.Garikipati excels at this especially.

Owing to the memory intensive nature of Avadhana, the number of Pṛcchakas plays a major role. The more the number of Pṛcchakas, the higher the challenge would be. Besides conducting Avadhanas, which in itself is a great feat, many Avadhanis also left a longer and lasting legacy by penning works and mentoring students who often grew up to contribute to Telugu and Kannada literature in their own uniquely rich ways.

Types 
The number of Pṛcchakas can be 8 (Aṣtāvadhānaṃ) or 100 (Śatāvadhānaṃ) or even 1000 (sahasrāvadhānaṃ). A person who has successfully performed an Ashtavadhana is called as Aṣtāvadhāni, a Śatāvadhānaṃ is called a Śatāvadhāni and a sahasrāvadhānaṃ is called Sahasrāvadhāni. The other lesser known forms of Avadhana are Chitravadhanam (painting), Nrutyāvadhānaṃ (Dancing) and Gaṇitāvadhānaṃ (Mathematics). Netrāvadhānaṃ (using the eyes) is another important form of avadhānaṃ.

Middle Ages

Even though this technique has existed prior to the Middle Ages, most of the available historic texts are available today describing encounters in the courts of Turk Invaders.

Several Jain Avadhanis displayed the art of Avadhanam in front of Mughal emperors and their Subahdars (governors). Nandivijay, a disciple of the monk Vijayasen Suri, performed the Ashtavadhana in front of Akbar. Akbar was very impressed with the art and conferred the title of Khushfahm (one of a brilliant intellect) on Nandivijay. Siddhichandra, a disciple of the monk Hiravijaya Suri, performed the Shatavadhana in front of Akbar where he performed 108 simultaneous tasks testing his miraculous memory. Akbar conferred the title of Khushfahm on Siddhichandra as well. Siddhichandra stayed in the Mughal court till the last days of Jahangir. Yashovijay Suri, the author of the work Jain Tarka Bhasha, performed several Avadhanams at Ahmedabad in the 17th century, including 18 Avadhanams in the presence of Mohabat Khan, who was the Subahdar of Gujarat under Aurangzeb.

19th and 20th centuries

 The trend of Avadhana in Telugu was popularized by Divakarla Tirupati sastry (1871–1919) and Chellapilla Venkata sastry (1870–1950) who were popular as Tirupati Venkata Kavulu. Contemporaries of Tirupati Venkata Kavulu that are famous for enriching the heritage of Avadhana include Kopparapu Sodara Kavulu and Venkata Raamakrishna Kavulu. Kopparapu Sodara kavulu are well known for their speed in composing poems. Students of Tirupati Venkata Kavulu include famous Gnanapith award winner Viswanatha Satyanarayana and well known Subbanna Satavadhani. Sri Paada Subrahmanya Sastri, a well-known short story and novel writer is a student of Venkata Rama Krishna Kavulu.
 Sathavathani Sheikh Thambi Pavalar - He was a Tamil poet, Scholar and a freedom fighter. He has performed sathavadhanam on 10-March-1907, at Madras Victoria Town hall. On 31 December 2008, a commemorative postage stamp on him was released.
 Raychandbhai, a Gujarati Jain poet was a Shatavadhani whose skills impressed Mahatma Gandhi greatly.
 Vidwan Ambati Subbaraya Chetty (March 22, 1906 – June 19, 1973) - He is a scholar known for his contributions to history, literature. He contributed to the freedom efforts of India. He was the first district magistrate of Indian origin in the entire state of Andhra Pradesh under British rule.
 Pandit Veni Madhav Shukla - He was a famous scholar as well as a Shatavadhani who lived in Jaunpur in the 20th century. He was a family relative of Rambhadracharya.
 30 day duration avadhanam called "Apoorva Pancha Sahasra Avadhanam" was performed by Dr. Medasani Mohan of Tirupati is considered as a record breaking performance, which included producing poetry (extempore rendition) in various forms like seesa padya, champakamala, sardulam, mattebhavikriditha, thetageetha etc. The avadhanam was conducted from February 18 to March 20, 2007 and more than one thousand poets participated as Pruchaka (questioners). The subjects of poetry included untouchability, AIDs, women power, internet, computers, students etc.
Gadiyaram Ramakrishna Sarma - freedom fighter, social reformer from Alampur has performed avadhaanam. He is well known for his efforts in reviving the temples of Alampur.

Current Avadhanis

Telugu Avadhanis

 Dr. Medasani Mohan - is referred to as 'Apoorva Pancha Sahasravadhana Sarvabhouma' for having performed the unique literary feat pancha sahasra avadhanam ( with 5000 Prucchakas ). He was the first to perform Sahasravadhanam. Dr. Mohan has performed over 1000 Astavadhanams, 16 Sathavadhanams, 40 Dwigunitha Avadhanam, 45 Chaturgunitha Avadhanams in India and abroad.
 Garikapati Narasimha Rao - He is referred to as Maha Sahasraavadhani for having subjected himself to thousand Prucchakas. He is well known for amazingly fast recollection of hundreds of verses composed and recited earlier and has the title 'Dhaarana Brahma Raakshasa'. His 'Saagara Ghosha' is an acclaimed literary work.
Rallabandi Kavitha Prasad - (Director, Dept of Culture, Govt of Andhra Pradesh, now posted as secretary, Dharma Prachara Parishad (DPP), in TTD, Tirupati) has performed more than 500 avadhanams, including satavadhanam and dvisatavadhanam. He also performed various avadhanas such as navarasavadhanam, and astadasavadhanam, etc. and introduced various new trends in avadhana vidya. Osmania University awarded him a Doctorate degree for his thesis on avadhanam vidya. He hails from Nemali Village, Gampalagudem Mandalam in Krishna District of Andhra Pradesh. He has published "ontari poola butta" an anthology of modern poetry. He is the author of several books such as Kadambini.
Smt Akella Bala Bhanu She performed her first ashtavadhanam at a very early age of 18 years in Kovvur Samskruta Kalasala. She is the first and only one woman Shathavadhani. She performed 100 ashtavadhanams, one satavadhanam and one dwi shatavadhanam. She is currently working as Sankrith Lecturer in Aditya Junior college, Amalapuram. She is also a relative of Sri Bharatam Srimannayarana Garu and Sri Yeluripati Anantaramayya Garu. She received many Awards and rewards. She also teaches Telugu poetry writing to many enthusiastic students.
Asavadi Prakasarao - Dr. CV Subbanna Shatavadhani was accepted as his teacher in Avadhanam Education and imbued with his blessings. He made his first Avadhanam in 1963 at the age of 19. Since then he has stamped as the only Dalit Avadhāni in Andhra literature and mesmerized the listeners with his extraordinary perceptiveness and indescribable majestic energy. He performed 171 Avadhanams, a double octave, not only in Andhra Pradesh but also in other parts of India such as Taruttani, Arakkonam, Pallipattu, Hosur, Bengaluru, Bellary, Donimalai, Delhi etc.
 Madugula Nagaphani Sarma
 Amudala Murali
Vaddiparti Padmakar - He is one of the contemporary Sahasravadhani. And it is also told, he is the only 'Tribhasha Sahasravadhani'. He does Avadhanam in Sanskrit, Telugu and Hindi. He also does Pravachanam in Telugu language. He hails from Eluru, AP.
Kadimella Vara Prasad - He is a Teacher by profession. Famous for his spontaneous and prolific [31] https://www.newsgram.com/avadhaanam-shataavadhaani-r-ganesh-part-1
Gannavaram Lalith Aditya - An 18 year old Samskrta Telugu Dvigunita Ashtavadhani born and raised in the United States recently awarded with the Avadhana Yuvasiromani award by the Vamsi Foundation of USA.

Sanskrit and Kannada
 Shatavadhani Ganesh - (Research Officer at Southern Regional Centre, Bangalore). He performed over 1004 Astavadhanams and 4 Shatavadhanams.  Also known as, Dr. R. Ganesh, he is fluent in more than 18 languages (Indian and foreign). Dr. Ganesh performed his 915th Ashtavadanam on Saturday, August 27, 2011 at Sri Vani Education Centre, Rajajinagar, Bengaluru 560 010, India, as part of the school's annual Avadhana presentation. He is also credited with introducing chitrakavya into avadhana, previously considered impossible to do in an avadhana. His recent Ashtaavadaana was performed at Seva Sadana, Bangalore on 11th January, 2015. He performed Shathavadhana at Bangalore, a first in Kannada, from 30 November 2012 to 2 December 2012.
He performed his 1000th avadhanam at NMKRV College on February 16, 2014.

 Pandit Sudhakar Kallurkar - He is a young pandit from Uttaradhi mutt and he performed ashtavadana in Sanskrit in divine presence of Sri Sathyatma thirtha Swamiji and stalwart Sanskrit scholars, More than 2000 people witnessed the Ashtavadana.
 Vid. Gundibailu Subrahmanya Bhat - He is a scholar from Udupi and he performed around 20 ashtavadanas in Sanskrit and Kannada mainly in and around Udupi District. He is a Vedanta scholar and has a Vidwat degree from Sri Manmadhva Sanskrita mahavidyalayam, Udupi.

Tamil Avadhanis 
 Rama. Kanaga Subburathinam - He is a Sodasa Avadhani (16 skills). He performed avadhanams in Tamil Language. He is also running a Tamil Monthly named "Kavanagar Muzhakkam". He also led a Charitable trust names "Kavanagar Muzhakkam Charitable Trust". He is the only Tamil Avadhani in present date.

Jain Avadhanis
 Muni Manak Maharaj - He was born in Sujangarh in Rajasthan and is a disciple of Acharya Tulsi. He is fluent in nine languages and has in-depth knowledge of Buddhism, Vedas and Indian philosophical schools in addition to Jainism. He knows astrology, palmistry and numerology. He has displayed Shatavadhan many times in Indian cities and also in other countries like the UK, the US and Canada.
 Muni Rajkaran - He was born in Gangashahar, Bikaner (Rajasthan, India) on 15 March 1927. He was initiated into monk hood in 1942 at the minor age of 15 and became the disciple of great Jain saint Acharya Tulsi. After initiation he studied various jain agamas, Sanskrit and prakrit languages, philosophy and logic. He had a powerful memory and grip on mathematics. so he started to learn avadhanam he did more than 500 avdhan in a single day and made a record. He has travelled on foot to Haryana, Madhya Pradesh, Uttar Pradesh, Bihar, Assam, Sikkim, West Bengal, Nagaland, Meghalaya, Tripura, Gujarat, Maharashtra, Karnataka, Tamil Nadu, Andhra Pradesh in India, and to Bhutan and Nepal abroad.
 Muni Mahendra Kumar - He was born in 1937. He was initiated into monkhood in 1957 and was an associate of Acharya Tulsi and his successor Acharya Mahaprajna. Muni Mahendra Kumar is a professor at Jain Vishva Bharati Institute, Ladnun, Rajasthan, serving in the departments of Science of Living and Preksha Meditation. He is a versatile scholar across diverse disciplines like Physics, Mathematics, Biology, Indian and Western Philosophy, Psychology, Parapsychology, Ancient History, Meditation, and Spirituality. He knows many languages including Sanskrit, Prakrit, Pali, English, German, Hindi, Gujarati and Rajasthani. He has authored, translated and edited more than 60 books. He is a practitioner and instructor of Preksha Meditation. His work "The Enigma of the Universe" and "Vishva Prahelika" (Hindi Version) is a research in the field of cosmology of modern science and ancient Jain philosophy. He has demonstrated Shatavadhana at various universities and international conferences and is sometimes referred to as the "Human Computer".
 Muni Ajitchandra Sagar - Born in 1988, Ajitchandra Sagar is a self-taught Shatavadhani under the guidance and Blessings Of Acharya Shree Naychandrasagarji Mharaj. He has performed several Samyukta Avadhana and Mahashatavadhana where he has subjected him to up to 200 questioners. He performs the "Netravadhana" (Avadhana using eyes) and "Ganitavadhana" (mathematics) also. He demonstrated the Shatavadhana at a conference of Jain Doctors' Federation in Ahmedabad in 2009. He demonstrated the Dvishatavadhana in March 2012 in Mumbai where he first heard with closed eyes 200 questions including puzzles, names of objects, places and persons, Sanskrit shlokas, factual and philosophical questions, foreign language words and complex mathematical problems. He then opened his eyes and answered all of them in addition to reciting the questions and answers in ascending, descending and random orders. Ajitchandra Sagar holds a Guinness record for being the world's second-fastest speaker.

References

External links
Seminar: Avadhana The Unique Art of India (2002, IGNCA)
 Shatavadhani-Dr. Ganesh
  The Hindu - July 2008 - A Literary treat
 
   The Hindu - 24 April 2011 - 'Ashtavadhanam' impresses one and all

Arts in India